Uptown Harlem is the second album by Webstar.

Track listing
"Young B Intro"
"Uptown Harlem"
"Can U Dance"
"It Takes Two" (featuring P-Star)
"Confused"
"Dedicated 2 Family"
"Footwork"
"Uptown Harlem DJ's"
"Left Right Front Back" (Bonus Track)
"Outro"

2008 albums
DJ Webstar albums